Denbo (also Dinbou, Danbou) now known as Ain al Dahab,   is a Sunni Muslim settlement/village in Akkar Governorate, Lebanon.

Consists of five large families the two biggest being the Taha and Taleb family.

Many locals of the village have migrated to other countries such as brazil, America, canada and especially Australia, for a better life style and to support family members back home.

References

External links
 

Populated places in Akkar District
Sunni Muslim communities in Lebanon